Doğançayır is a town in Seyitgazi district, Eskişehir Province, Turkey. Formerly known as Arapören.

Location

Geography
Doğançayır is a considered to be a plain. The land owned by the people living currently in Doğançayır is about 90 hectares. The Kırkkız Mountain, where the TV transmitter is located, is the only peak around the town which has an approximate height of 1800 m. The town is established on the foot of the mountain. The Seydisuyu, an important branch of the Sakarya River, passes through the town. Two bridges in Doğançayır connect the banks of the river. Although there used to be the danger of floods from the river in the spring, after the construction of the Çatıören Dam, it is possible to pass across the river using stepping stones on the water.

Economy
Economic activities in Doğançayır are mostly limited to farming and stock raising. Sugar beets, wheat, sunflower and clover are the most favored crops.

Culture
Doğançayır is an Alevi town, whereas people from Sunni origins also live in. It is possible to recognize aspects of Alevi beliefs.  Doğançayır is culturally most famous for organizing an annual remembrance day for Nazım Hikmet on June 3.

Government
CHP won the last municipality elections and the current mayor is Ali Rıza Koca.

References

Bibliography

External links
 Seyitgazi governor's official website 
 Doğançayır municipality's official website 

Towns in Turkey
Eskişehir
Populated places in Eskişehir Province